Comfort Woman is the fifth solo album by Me'shell Ndegeocello. It was released on  October 14, 2003, on Maverick Records. The album peaked at #150 on the Billboard Top 200 list that year. The album also peaked at #43 on Billboard's R&B Album chart. The LP was the final record released by Maverick, ending her ten-year contract.

Track listing
"Love Song, No. 1" (Me'shell Ndegeocello) – 4:03
"Come Smoke My Herb" (Ndegeocello) – 3:53
"Andromeda & the Milky Way" (Ndegeocello, Allen Cato) – 4:28
"Love Song #2" (Ndegeocello) – 3:47
"Body" (Ndegeocello) – 3:42
"Liliquoi Moon" (Ndegeocello) – 4:41
"Love Song #3" (Ndegeocello, Doyle Bramhall II) – 4:32
"Fellowship" (Ndegeocello, Bob Marley) – 3:14
"Good Intentions" (Ndegeocello, Chris Dave) – 3:48
"Thankful" (Ndegeocello) – 3:25

Personnel
Me'shell Ndegeocello – bass guitar, vocals, producer, vocal arrangement, additional instrumentation
Allen Cato – guitar, producer, talk box, drum programming
Oren Bloedow – guitar
Doyle Bramhall II – guitar, soloist
Chris Dave – drums
Kofi Taha – executive producer
Jeff Patrick Krasno – executive producer
Eric Dyba – engineer
Chris Bittner – assistant engineer
Ari Raskin – assistant engineer
Emily Lazar – mastering
Bob Power – mixing
Sasha Victory – tracking
Flem – art direction, design
Frank Maddocks – art direction, design
Mark Seliger – photography

References

External links
 Personnel
 Meshell Official Website
 ME'SHELL NDEGÉOCELLO COMFORT WOMAN ALBUM
 

Meshell Ndegeocello albums
2003 albums
Maverick Records albums